Friedrich Brüggemann (1850, Bremen – 1878, London ) was a German zoologist and entomologist

Friedrich Brüggemann was an Assistant in the zoological Institute in Jena

Later he was engaged in work on the corals in the collection of the British Museum. He died of lung haemorrhage at the age of 28.

Works

Coleoptera
1873 "Systematisches Verzeichniss der bisher in der Gegend von Bremen gefundenen Käferarten". Abhandl. Naturw. Ver. Bremen, 3: 441–524.

Corals
1877. "Notes on Stony Corals in the Collection of the British Museum". Annals and Magazine of Natural History. Ser. 4, Vol. xix. pp. 415–422.
1879 "Corals. An account of the petrological, botanical, and zoological collections made in Kerguelen's Land and Rodriguez during the Transit of Venus expeditions, carried out by order of Her Majesty's government in the years 1874–75". Phil Trans R Soc Lond 168: 569–579.

Birds

1876 Beiträge zur Ornithologie von Celebes und Sangir Abhandlungen des Naturwissenschaftlichen Vereins zu Bremen
1877  Über eine Vogelsammlung von Südost-Borneo Abhandlungen des Naturwissenschaftlichen Vereins zu Bremen
1877  Nachträgliche Notizen zur Ornithologie von Celebes Abhandlungen des Naturwissenschaftlichen Vereins zu Bremen
1878 Weitere Mitteilungen über die Ornithologie von Zentral-Borneo Abhandlungen des Naturwissenschaftlichen Vereins zu Bremen

References
Buchenau, Franz (1879): "Friedrich Bruggemann".  Abhandlungen des Naturwissenschaftlichen Vereins zu Bremen 06/1:319

External links
DEI Zalf
NWV Bremen

German entomologists
19th-century German zoologists
German ornithologists
Scientists from Bremen
Respiratory disease deaths in England
Deaths from pulmonary hemorrhage
1850 births
1878 deaths
German emigrants to the United Kingdom